DeCamps Island is an island between First Lake and Second Lake in Herkimer County, New York. It is located east of Old Forge. Dog Island is located southwest of DeCamps Island.

References

Islands of New York (state)
Islands of Herkimer County, New York